Birds of Exile is a 1964 Turkish drama film, directed by Halit Refiğ and starring Tanju Gürsu, Filiz Akın, Özden Çelik and Cüneyt Arkın in his acting debut.

Cast 
Cüneyt Arkın as Selim
Filiz Akın as Ayla	Jeyan
Özden Çelik as Kemal Bakırcıoğlu
Pervin Par as Fatma Bakırcıoğlu
Tanju Gürsu as Murat
Önder Somer as Orhan
 Sevda Ferdağ as Seval/Naciye
 Hüseyin Baradan as Haybeci
 Mümtaz Ener as Tahir Bakırcıoğlu

References

External links 

1964 films
Turkish drama films
1964 drama films
Films directed by Halit Refiğ
Films shot in Istanbul
Films set in Istanbul
Turkish black-and-white films
1960s Turkish-language films